You is the twenty-second studio album by American singer Aretha Franklin, released on October 16, 1975, by Atlantic Records.

Background
It was a commercial disappointment, stalling at #83 on Billboards album chart. The album's only pop chart single, "Mr. D.J." peaked at #53 on Billboard'''s Hot 100,  while climbing to only #13 R&B. The title track, issued as the follow-up, reached #15 R&B. The album brought an end to Aretha's long collaboration with Atlantic producer Jerry Wexler.

Critical receptionThe Guardian'' named "Mr. D.J. (5 for the D.J.)" one of Franklin's "30 Greatest Songs", and called it "a horn and call-and-response vocal-laden strut that defies anyone in earshot not to dance."

Track listing

 "Mr. D.J. (5 for the D.J.)" (Aretha Franklin) - 4:25
 "It Only Happens (When I Look at You)" (Ken Gold, Michael Denne) - 4:23
 "I'm Not Strong Enough To Love You Again" (Frank Johnson) - 4:16
 "Walk Softly" (Van McCoy) - 4:48
 "You Make My Life" (Bettye Crutcher, Frederick Knight) - 4:15
 "Without You" (Randy Stewart, Mack Rice) - 5:13
 "The Sha-La Bandit" (Jerry Ferguson, Wade Davis) - 4:00
 "You" (Jerry Butler, Marvin Yancy, Randy Stewart) - 4:40
 "You Got All The Aces" (Ronnie Shannon) - 3:52
 "As Long As You Are There" (Carolyn Franklin) - 3:44

Personnel

Performance
 Aretha Franklin – lead vocals
 Clarence McDonald, Sylvester Rivers – keyboards
 Jay Graydon, Ray Parker Jr., Lee Ritenour, David T. Walker – guitar
 Scott Edwards, Tony Newton – bass guitar
 Ed Greene – drums
 Gary Coleman – percussion
 Bobbye Hall – congas
 Jim Horn – flute (2)
 Bud Brisbois – trumpet (2)
 Tom Scott – saxophone (6)
 Ernie Watts – saxophone (7)
 Gene Page – arrangements
 Harry Bluestone – concertmaster of string section
 Margaret Branch – backing vocals
 Brenda Bryant – backing vocals
 Cissy Houston – backing vocals
 Pam Vincent – backing vocals

Production
 Producers – Aretha Franklin and Jerry Wexler
 Engineer – Frank Kejmar 
 Assistant Engineer – Steve Hall 
 Mixing – Aretha Franklin and Dave Hassinger
 Mix Assistant – Jim Nipar 
 Copyist – George Annis 
 Cover Photo – Norman Dugger

References

1975 albums
Aretha Franklin albums
Albums arranged by Gene Page
Albums produced by Jerry Wexler
Atlantic Records albums